The Volcan du Diable, the Devil's Volcano in English, is a small mountain of the Kerguelen Islands, located in the central region of the main island of Grande Terre. It reaches the height of 315 metres.

References

External links
 Global Volcanism Program: Kerguelen Islands

Landforms of the Kerguelen Islands
Volcanoes of the French Southern and Antarctic Lands